Maine Lumberjacks were an American minor league basketball team formed as an expansion team in 1978. The franchise played 17 seasons in the Continental Basketball Association (CBA), calling six different cities home. The team was originally based in Bangor, Maine.

History

Bay State Bombardiers (1983-86)
After five seasons in Bangor the team was relocated to Brockton, Massachusetts and were renamed the Bay State Bombardiers. After one season in Brockton, the Bombardiers moved their home games to Worcester, Mass., and the Worcester Auditorium. The 1985-86 season was the most successful in franchise history, going 30-18 (third-best in the CBA) during the regular season. The Bombardiers eliminated the Baltimore Lightning in the first round of the playoffs but fell to eventual champion Tampa Bay Thrillers in the Eastern Division Finals.

Pensacola Tornados (1986-91)
Three seasons in Massachusetts were followed by a relocation to Pensacola, Florida for the 1986-87 season. The team was renamed Pensacola Tornados, the second CBA team to use the name.

Birmingham Bandits (1991-92)
Another relocation and name change came before the 1991-92 season, this time to Birmingham, Alabama. The team was known as the Birmingham Bandits for just one season before team owner Bob McMillan moved the team again.

Rochester Renegade (1992-94)
Rochester, Minnesota was the next home of the franchise, now renamed the Rochester Renegade. The first year was the worst in franchise and CBA history, winning just six games. The off-season saw the hiring of Bill Musselman as head coach, leading the Renegades to a 31-25 record. Ronnie Granderson was named league MVP.

Harrisburg Hammerheads (1994-95)
After two seasons in southeast Minnesota the team was sold and relocated for the fifth and final time. The Harrisburg Hammerheads played 33 of 56 regular season games during the 1994-95 season before the CBA terminated the franchise for failure to keep financial commitments.

Amongst other noteworthy points was responsible for the drafting of Billy Ray Bates into the NBA.

Season-by-season

Notable players

 Joe Dawson (born 1960), American-Israeli basketball player, 1992 Israeli Basketball Premier League MVP
 Mike Largey (born 1960), basketball player in the Israeli Basketball Premier League
 Randy Owens (1959-2015), American basketball player
 James Terry (born 1960), American-Israeli basketball player
 Jerry Sichting (born 1956), 10-year NBA veteran; long-time NBA coach

References

External links
 History of the CBA

1978 establishments in Maine
1982 disestablishments in Maine
Basketball teams established in 1978
Basketball teams disestablished in 1982
Sports in Bangor, Maine
Continental Basketball Association teams
Defunct basketball teams in Maine